Jimmy Reed at Carnegie Hall is a double album by Jimmy Reed, released in 1961. Though the title suggests that the record was recorded live, it consists of studio recreations of a Carnegie Hall performance along with additional studio recordings.

"Bright Lights, Big City", which opens the album, was released as a single around the same time. It became one of Reed's most successful and last songs on the Billboard Hot R&B charts.  The album includes several other Reed songs that appeared on the charts between 1956 and 1961.

Critical reception

Writing for AllMusic, critic Richie Unterberger gave the album five out of five stars.  He noted "In some ways, it almost does make for a greatest-hits compilation, as it contains most of Reed's most popular tunes".

Track listing
All songs by Jimmy Reed; except where noted.

Record 1, side 1:
"Bright Lights, Big City" – 2:50
"I'm Mr. Luck" – 3:34
"Baby What's Wrong" – 3:24
"Found Joy" – 3:41
"Kind of Lonesome" – 2:52

Record 1, side 2:
"Aw Shucks, Hush Your Mouth" – 2:33
"Tell Me You Love Me" (Jimmy Reed, Al Smith) – 2:54
"Blue Carnegie" – 2:53
"I'm a Love You" – 2:07
"Hold Me Close" – 2:38
"Blue Blue Water" – 2:45

Record 2, side 1:
"Baby What You Want Me to Do" – 2:31
"You Don't Have to Go" – 3:10
"Hush Hush" – 2:43
"Found Love" – 2:24
"Honest I Do" (Jimmy Reed, Ewart Abner) – 2:50
"You Got Me Dizzy" – 2:58

Record 2, side 2:
"Big Boss Man" (Luther Dixon, Al Smith) – 2:54
"Take Out Some Insurance" (Jesse Stone) – 2:31
"Boogie in the Dark" – 2:41
"Going to New York" – 2:26
"Ain't That Loving You Baby" – 2:25
"The Sun is Shining" (Jimmy Reed, Ewart Abner) – 2:57

Personnel
Jimmy Reed - guitar, vocals, harmonica
Eddie Taylor - guitar
Phil Upchurch - guitar
Lonnie Brooks - guitar
William "Lefty" Bates - second guitar
Willie Dixon - bass guitar
Earl Phillips - drums
Mary Lee Reed - backing vocals

References

Jimmy Reed albums
Vee-Jay Records albums
1961 albums
Albums produced by Calvin Carter